The National Academy of Sports (NAS) is a government-run sports academy managed by the Philippine government.

History

The National Academy of Sports system was established with the signing of Republic Act No. 11470 on June 9, 2020 by President Rodrigo Duterte. The NAS is a body attached to the Department of Education.

The main campus was set up at the New Clark City Sports Complex in Capas, Tarlac.

Josephine Joy Reyes was appointed as the NAS system's first Executive Director in October 2020. The first set of officials for the NAS system had their oath-taking in May 2021.

In July 2021, the NAS launched its first NAS Annual Search for Competent, Exceptional, Notable and Talented Student-Athlete Scholars (NASCENT SAS), an annual scholarship program which would scout Filipino student-athletes from across the Philippines.

The NAS' first academic year officially started on September 13, 2021. Due to the COVID-19 pandemic, classes will be initially and primarily done virtually. The construction of a dedicated campus for the NAS in New Clark City began in early October 2021. It is scheduled to be completed by February 2022.

Campus
The dedicated campus for the NAS will have a academic and administration building as well as a multipurpose gymnasium.

Academic program
The NAS intends to provide secondary education program with a curriculum intended to improve its students performance in sports. Natural-born qualified athletes will be granted full scholarship. The NAS has plans to cooperate with the Philippine Sports Commission and would be allowed to hire foreign coaches as part of its staff. Para-athletes will also be accommodated by the school system.

The NAS sources its students through its NAS Annual Search for Competent, Exceptional, Notable and Talented Student-Athlete Scholars (NASCENT SAS) scholarship program which scouts Filipino student-athletes from across the Philippines.

The initial program will cover eight sports:
Aquatics
Athletics
Badminton
Gymnastics
Judo
Table tennis
Taekwondo
Weightlifting

References

External links

Republic Act No. 11470 – Official Gazette

2020 establishments in the Philippines
High schools in Tarlac
Sport schools in the Philippines
Department of Education (Philippines)